is a Japanese yuri anime television series produced by Silver Link and directed by Kunihiko Ikuhara. The series was first announced via a website in August 2012, where it was referred to as the "Kunihiko Ikuhara/Penguinbear Project." The series first aired in Japan between January 5, 2015 and March 30, 2015 and is licensed in North America by Funimation. A manga adaptation illustrated by Akiko Morishima was serialized in Gentosha's Comic Birz magazine between February 2014 and April 2016 and has been licensed in English by Tokyopop under the title Yuri Bear Storm. The name appears to be a reference to Akira Yoshimura's novelization of the Sankebetsu brown bear incident, though any more concrete link besides the presence of human-attacking bears is only speculated.

Plot
The manga and anime versions have significantly different plotlines.

In the manga version, the shy Kureha meets the transfer student Ginko, who appears in her dreams as a bear princess. As Kureha becomes friends with Ginko and gets to know her, she learns that Ginko is wrapped up in her own world in which she believes everything is made up of bears.

In the anime version, humans have created a Wall of Severance to separate themselves from the bears, who grew violent and attacked humans after a far-off planet known as Kumaria exploded, turning into a meteor shower that fell upon earth. Two bears, Ginko Yurishiro and Lulu Yurigasaki, sneak through the Wall of Severance and disguise themselves as humans, enrolling in the prestigious Arashigaoka Academy and taking an interest in Kureha Tsubaki, a human girl who despises bears after her mother was killed and eaten by one.

Characters

The first titular heroine and a bear who takes human form and transfers to Arashigaoka Academy, where she sets her sights on Kureha. It is later revealed that, as a bear, she was once friends with Kureha and her mother. At the end of the story, Kureha gives Ginko her promise kiss, and the two head on a journey beyond severance; Lulu states that no one knows what has happened to them afterwards.

In the manga, Ginko sees every living thing as bears, believing Kureha to be her fated one, as Kureha is the only one who appears human to her. Ginko assumes this is because the entire world is made up of bears and only she, her mother, and Yurika can see the world for what it truly is, being descended from the royal family of the forest. However, it is later revealed that the "bear universe" is just a delusion implanted into her by her mother, Kale. She later regains her memories, remembering that Kale was responsible for the death of Reia, and tries to distance herself from Kureha.

The second titular heroine and another bear who transferred in alongside Ginko. She was once the princess of a kingdom of bears, but after her jealousy drove her little brother to his death, she decided to help Ginko fulfill her quest for the promised kiss. She is killed by the Invisible Storm while defending Ginko and reunited with her brother in the afterlife.

In the manga, she introduces herself as Ginko's childhood friend and alleged "lover" who once served under her as a maid, but Ginko apparently has no memory of this. Lulu is much more eccentric in the manga, and views Kureha as a rival for Ginko's love, though the two become friends anyway. Similar to her anime counterpart, she feels burdened over the death of her brother.

The main protagonist and a second year student at Arashigaoka Academy, who is in love with her friend Sumika and devastated when she is eaten by a bear. Even prior to this incident, Kureha harbors a strong hatred of bears, after her mother, Reia, was also killed by one. She is befriended by Lulu and Ginko, eventually falling in love with the latter. She and Ginko eventually share a Promise Kiss and head out on a journey beyond severance; Lulu states that no one knows what has happened to them afterwards.

In the manga, she is a shy girl who wears glasses and a ponytail. She opens up more and abandons the glasses and ponytail after meeting Ginko, who shows up frequently in her dreams as a bear person after her transfer to Arashigaoka Academy. She soon falls in love with Ginko and becomes determined to help find the cause of her suffering, while also figuring out how her mother died.

He always speaks in a seductive manner, and his favourite catchphrase is 

In the manga, he is the student council president of Arashigaoka Academy, who is an infamous womanizer who is in love with Ginko. He, along with the other Life Judgement Guys, also appear in bear form, first in Kureha and Ginko's dreams, and later as Sumika's house. According to the second volume's omake, he and the others share the same names as their anime counterparts.

The bespectacled prosecutor of the Life Judgement Guys. He always speaks in a calm and collected manner, but is often flustered by the behavior of Life Beauty. His catchphrase is 

The defense attorney of the Life Judgement Guys. Looking younger than the others, he speaks in a childish manner and values cuteness above everything else.

Kureha's classmate, friend, and lover. Her refusal to exclude Kureha along with the rest of the Invisible Storm, a group of schoolgirls who exclude those who do not follow social cues that they consider evil, gets her excluded as well. Sumika is eaten by Mitsuko early on in the story, with Mitsuko stealing her glasses as a souvenir. Later, she appears before Kureha as Lady Kumaria to turn Kureha into a bear and send Kureha and Ginko on a journey beyond severance.
In the manga, Sumika is a girl with a collection of stuffed bears who has romantic feelings for Kureha, but decides to stay her friend and aids her in helping Ginko. She is rumored to be an alleged "bear witch" who summons the souls of the dead to create living bears. When Lulu visits her, she uses some form a magic to allow Lulu to make her peace with Milne.

A teacher at Arashigaoka Academy, who was a close friend of Reia. Yurika was a bear who grew up in Arashigaoka Academy and was befriended by Reia, but felt betrayed by Reia giving other people, especially Kureha, love, and thus ate her out of anger and jealousy after Reia lent her star pendant, the symbol of their friendship, to Ginko. Since eating Reia did not satisfy Yurika, she presently plans to thus make Kureha her "bride-in-the-box" and eat her, and manipulates several of the students to achieve this end. Though Yurika gets close to success, she ends up foiled at the last minute, killed by the Invisible Storm.
In the manga, Yurika is Ginko's paternal aunt, and the two live together. She cares a lot for Ginko's mother, and though she is frustrated by her forgetfulness and eccentricity, will use any excuse to go and visit her. She is also in a sexual relationship with Ginko's mother.

The class representative of Kureha and Sumika's class, and also a member of the Invisible Storm. In reality, Mitsuko is a bear as well as the one who ate Sumika, stealing her glasses as a memoir of her kill. Mitsuko is incredibly manipulative, and often uses sexual domination to get her way. She attempts to eat Kureha, but is shot by her and killed. She later appears before Ginko as the personification of her desire and attempts to seduce her into eating Kureha, but is rejected.
Mitsuko is also the class representative in the manga series. She was in middle school with Sumika and believes rumors that she is a bear witch after her friend disappeared while visiting her house.

Kureha's classmate, another bear, who is in a relationship with Mitsuko, and also a member and the first-seen leader of the Invisible Storm. Her catchphrase, only said when she is a bear, is "Nasty!" She attempts to attack Kureha out of jealousy, but is killed after Mitsuko shoots her in the head. Her corpse is later remodeled as a cyborg by the Invisible Storm to power a large cannon. After Kureha's and Ginko's escape, she is rejected by the Invisible Storm and labelled as "defective", but is found by Uchiko, and forms a friendship together.

Kureha's classmate, a member and one of the leaders of the Invisible Storm. Katyusha is seen putting down with bear warning signs during an alarm in the first episode. She is later killed and eaten by Ginko and Lulu, with her iconic headband preserved, and is used to lure Eriko to the flowerbed for eating. Katyusha was the Invisible Storm leader who outed Sumika for refusing to exclude Kureha.
In the manga, she works under Yurika as a maid.

Kureha's classmate and a member of the Invisible Storm, as well as the second leader of the Storm, appointed as leader after Konomi's death. She is seduced and manipulated by Mitsuko into becoming the leader in order to ensure Kureha's exclusion so Mitsuko can target and eat her; however, Ginko and Lulu lure Eriko to the flowerbed and eat her as part of a plan to protect Kureha.
Eriko makes a minor appearance in the manga, having a friendly conversation with Kureha post-makeover.

Kureha's classmate, a member and the third leader of the Invisible Storm. Kaoru wishes to become an important person who won't be excluded. Upon appointment as leader of the Storm, Kaoru formulates a plan to manipulate and torment Kureha, and is later revealed to have manipulated Sumika as a part of this plan, but her plan is foiled by the interference of Ginko. It is later revealed that Yurika was manipulating Kaoru to her own ends, with the two apparently also engaging in sexual activities. Yurika ends up eating Kaoru after Kaoru outlives her perceived usefulness.
So far, Kaoru has only appeared in the manga as a cameo alongside Mitsuko, where she on Lulu's bathing antics.

Kureha's classmate and the fourth and final leader of the Invisible Storm, who heads up an anti-bear organization known as the KMTG to eliminate the bears. She is not beyond outright lying to get her way. She has a tendency to emphasize her words using "way" in place of "very" or "really".

Kureha's classmate and a member of the Invisible Storm, who arms and controls the beam cannon used to shoot bears. At the end of the series, she witnesses Kureha and Ginko's escape to beyond severance, thus quitting the Invisible Storm after Choko lies and tells the other Invisible Storm members of their deaths. Uchiko later finds Konomi rejected in a box by the flowerbed, labelled as "defective", and the two form a friendship. During the Invisible Storm's exclusion sessions, Uchiko is frequently seen near the top of the list.

Kureha's late mother, who attended Arashigaoka Academy. Reia was a kind woman who shared her love with bears as well, and encouraged her daughter to do the same. Reia was killed by Yurika after giving Ginko the star pendant that Yurika gave her as a symbol of their bond. Her death is what led to Kureha developing her present hatred of bears. Reia was also an author of picture books, one of which plays an important role in the story and Kureha's and Ginko's relationship.

In the manga, she was apparently killed and eaten by Ginko's mother.

Lulu's younger brother and prince of the Bear Kingdom. Milne automatically replaced Lulu as heir of the kingdom after his birth, much to Lulu's shock and hatred, thus leading to her making several attempts on his life to reclaim the attention of the kingdom and title as immediate heir all for herself. Milne ended up dying after being stung by bees while trying to get his sister a promise kiss, but despite Lulu getting everything she wanted, she felt empty and miserable inside because of it.

In the manga, he lived with Lulu, who always looked to protect her, but was killed in a traffic accident while trying to follow her one night. He later reappears before Lulu again as a result of Sumika's magic.

A goddess presiding over both humans and bears, taking the form of a meteor. When the meteor was destroyed, the bears rose up against the humans and her role was taken over by the Life Judgement Guys. She is once again reformed when Kureha affirms her love for Ginko, taking the form of Sumika, and turns Kureha into a bear, before sending Kureha and Ginko off onto a journey beyond severance.

 

Ginko's mother in the manga version. She is an eccentric and forgetful woman who lives in a foreign country due to her poor health. She is in a sexual relationship with Yurika. She is also the author of The Moon Girl and Forest Bear in the manga version. She implanted the idea of a "bear universe" inside Ginko's head for unknown reasons, and tries to encourage Ginko to eat Kureha, having apparently eaten Reia herself. She was apparently in love with Reia, allegedly killing her after she married a man.
In the anime, Kale is an allegedly male character portrayed as being played by a female actress, referred to as simply  by Yurika, who looked after Yurika when she was a young cub and was killed by her upon trying to abandon her.

Media

Printed media
The manga adaptation illustrated by Akiko Morishima began serialization in Gentosha's Comic Birz magazine on February 28, 2014, featuring a completely different plot to the anime series, and ended on April 30, 2016. The series was compiled into three tankōbon volumes released between November 21, 2014 and May 24, 2016. Tokyopop will release the manga adaptation in North America from January 22, 2019.

A novelization of the series, written by Ikuhara, Takayo Ikami, and Kei Takahashi and illustrated by Morishima, has been published by Gentosha Comics. The first novel was released on January 19, 2015 while the second novel was released on March 31, 2015.

Volume list

Anime
Yurikuma Arashi, also referred to as the "Penguinbear Project", was first revealed by Kunihiko Ikuhara at an event held on March 23, 2013, in which brief footage was shown behind closed doors. On August 24, 2014, the official website revealed the anime would be produced by Silver Link, with character designs adapted by Etsuko Sumimoto from Akiko Morishima's originals. The series aired in Japan between January 5, 2015 and March 30, 2015. The series was licensed in North America and the United Kingdom by Funimation, who simulcast the subtitled version as it aired and streamed a broadcast dub version from March 16, 2015. The anime soundtrack was released on April 24, 2015.

Episode list
All episodes were co-written by Kunihiko Ikuhara and Takayo Ikami, who had previously collaborated on Penguindrum.

Reception
The series has been praised as tackling the "prejudice facing gay people in Japan" while simultaneously being a "moving tale of prejudice and fear and love" which focuses on cultural treatment of all women, especially those who are lesbians, criticizes the "idealization of female innocence and purity," and serves as a study of bigotry. Further reviews praised as a well-written drama which is "densely packed with social commentary, multivalent symbolism, and references to historical events, [and] literature," is LGBT-friendly, and is "all about lesbians."

References

External links
 
 

2010s Japanese LGBT-related television series
2015 Japanese novels
2015 Japanese television series endings
Anime with original screenplays
Fantasy anime and manga
Funimation
Gentosha manga
Japanese LGBT-related animated television series
Light novels
Mainichi Broadcasting System original programming
Discrimination in fiction
Science fiction anime and manga
Seinen manga
Silver Link
Tokyopop titles
Yuri (genre) anime and manga
Yuri (genre) light novels
LGBT speculative fiction television series